Gabriel Henrique Silva, sometimes known as just Gabriel (Rio de Janeiro, March 4, 1989), is a Brazilian footballer who acts as left back.

Career
Created in the youth ranks of CFZ do Rio, the athlete was hired by Botafogo in 2008, the year he competed in the tournament Octavio Pinto Guimarães.

In 2009, ascended the professional team and Botafogo FR logo on his debut before the Tigers Sports Club of Brazil scored a goal. In 2010, he was cast champion championship.

In July 2010 the player was loaned to Ceará, by the end of the season.

In August 2011 he moved to the youth team of Sport Club Corinthians Paulista.

Contract
 Ceará.

References

External links
zerozerofootball.com

1989 births
Brazilian footballers
Living people
Footballers from Rio de Janeiro (city)
Campeonato Brasileiro Série A players
Campeonato Brasileiro Série C players
Botafogo de Futebol e Regatas players
Duque de Caxias Futebol Clube players
Ceará Sporting Club players
Sport Club Corinthians Paulista players
Grêmio Barueri Futebol players
Guarani FC players
Associação Atlética Luziânia players
Madureira Esporte Clube players
Olaria Atlético Clube players
Clube Esportivo Aimoré players
Central Sport Club players
Association football fullbacks